William Thoburn (April 14, 1847 – January 23, 1928) was a Canadian woollen manufacturer and politician in the province of Ontario.

Born in Portsmouth, England, Thoburn came to Canada in 1857 and was educated at Pakenham School in Pakenham, Ontario. He moved to Almonte, Ontario in 1867 and eventually became a woollen manufacturer. He was elected to the House of Commons of Canada for the electoral district of Lanark North in the 1908 federal election. A Conservative, he was re-elected in the 1911 election. He served for several years as a school trustee and councillor, and was for seven years Mayor of Almonte.

References
 
 

1847 births
1928 deaths
English emigrants to pre-Confederation Ontario
Conservative Party of Canada (1867–1942) MPs
Mayors of places in Ontario
Members of the House of Commons of Canada from Ontario
Politicians from Portsmouth
Immigrants to the Province of Canada
People from Almonte, Ontario